Johann Peter Krafft (15 September 1780, Hanau - 28 October 1856, Vienna) was a German-born Austrian painter who specialized in portraits, historical works and genre scenes.

Biography 
His father was an enamel painter who originally came from a family of wine merchants in Alsace. His brother, Joseph Krafft (1786-1828) also became a painter of portrait miniatures. By the age of ten, he was already attending a drawing school.

In 1799, he and sister were sent to live with an aunt in Vienna. He immediately enrolled at the Academy of Fine Arts, where he studied history painting with Heinrich Friedrich Füger. In 1802, he travelled to Paris with Veit Hanns Schnorr von Carolsfeld to continue his studies. There, he made the acquaintance of Jacques-Louis David and François Gérard, who had a major influence on his style.

He returned to Vienna in 1805, where he established himself as a portrait painter. From 1808 to 1809, he went on a study trip through Italy. He became a member of the Academy in 1813. Two years later, he married Juliana Preisinger. Three of their children became painters: Marie (1812–1885), Albrecht (1816–1847) and Julie (1821–1903). He was appointed a Professor at the Academy in 1823.

In 1828, he was named Director of the Galerie Belvedere, a position he held until his death. He became an Academic Counselor in 1835. Over the next few years, he travelled to Munich, Dresden and Venice, where he purchased 80 works for the museum. He was also employed as an expert on the preservation of monuments, working at Karlstein Castle, Schönbrunn Palace and the Jesuit Church.

He was buried at the Vienna Central Cemetery. In 1885, a street in the Leopoldstadt district was named after him.

Selected paintings

References 

 Constantin von Wurzbach: Krafft, Peter. In: Biographisches Lexikon des Kaiserthums Oesterreich. 13. Theil. Kaiserlich-königliche Hof- und Staatsdruckerei, Vienna 1865, pp. 106–110 (Online)

Further reading
 Marianne Frodl-Schneemann: Johann Peter Krafft 1780–1856. Monographie und Verzeichnis der Gemälde. Herold, 1984
 Nina Struckmeyer: Krafft, Johann Peter, in: Bénédicte Savoy and France Nerlich (Eds.): Pariser Lehrjahre. Ein Lexikon zur Ausbildung deutscher Maler in der französischen Hauptstadt. Vol. 1: 1793–1843, Berlin/Boston 2013, pp. 152–154.

External links 

 ArtNet: More works by Krafft.
 
 
 

1780 births
1856 deaths
Austrian male painters
19th-century Austrian painters
19th-century Austrian male artists
Burials at the Vienna Central Cemetery
Academy of Fine Arts Vienna alumni
History painters
Austrian portrait painters
People from Hanau
German emigrants to Austria-Hungary